Tymoczko is a surname. Notable people with the name include
Dmitri Tymoczko, American music composer and theorist, son of Maria and Thomas
Julianna Tymoczko, American mathematician, daughter of Maria and Thomas
Maria Tymoczko, American comparative literature scholar, wife of Thomas, mother of Dmitri and Julianna
Thomas Tymoczko, American logician and philosopher of mathematics, husband of Maria, father of Dmitri and Julianna